Australia IV is a 12-metre class yacht that competed in the 1987 Defender Selection Series.

After being eliminated from the 1987 Defender selection series, Australia IV and her sister ship Australia III were sold to Japanese businessman Masakuzu Kobayashi . Australia IV was renamed Bengal III, painted red and shipped to Japan, where they were to be part of preparations for a proposed Japanese America's Cup Challenge.

, Australia IV, now renamed Bengal III, sits on the hard stand of Miri Marina, Borneo, Malaysia.

References

12-metre class yachts
Sailing yachts of Australia
Citizen Cup yachts
Sailing yachts designed by Ben Lexcen